Martin Møller Nielsen (born August 1964) is a UK-based Danish billionaire businessman and the chairman of Nordic Aviation Capital (NAC).

Career 
Møller founded NAC in Skive, Denmark in 1990.

In 2015, he sold a 67% stake in it to private equity firms EQT and Kirkbi in a transaction that valued the firm at $3.3 billion. He still owns 33% of the company.

As of 2016, NAC has a fleet of 275 aircraft, leased to 30 regional airlines including Air Berlin and Etihad.

In 2021, the Sunday Times Rich List estimated his net worth to be £809 million.

He lives in Hampshire, England.

References

1964 births
British billionaires
Danish billionaires
Living people
People from Skive Municipality